Shadow Wave is the twelfth novel in the CHERUB series by Robert Muchamore. It was published by Hodder Children's Books on 26 August 2010, and features the final mission of the long-standing central character James Adams. A limited edition of Shadow Wave, with an orange cover (designed by Callum East), was made available exclusively at W.H.Smith. Details of Muchamore's plans to create a small three-book series called "Aramov" without James, were revealed via a secret website detailed on the back pages of all copies of the book.

Plot
James Adams works undercover with MI5 as a Brigands Motorcycle Club biker, trying to bring down its leader Ralph "The Führer" Donnington (continuing from his mission in the previous CHERUB book Brigands M.C.). His girlfriend Kerry Chang is also working with him as an interpreter in a set-up weapons deal. The police surround them and the Führer tries to escape but ends up falling down a cliff and breaking his leg. He is taken into police custody.

James returns to CHERUB campus to attend a wedding between mission controller Chloe Blake and her fiancé. At the wedding, he is reunited with several ex-CHERUB agents and former staff members, including the cruel former head instructor Norman Large, his ex-girlfriend Dana Smith and his best friend and retired agent Kyle Blueman and old friend Amy. The day before the wedding, James walks in on Bethany Parker naked in Bruce Norris' room. Bruce then admits that he is shagging her. Kyle finds a mission briefing for James to act as the son of David Secombe, an important figure in the UK Government who is negotiating a weapons deal with Malaysian Defence Minister Tan Abdullah. Kyle tells James about how, when he was assisting in a CHERUB basic training course in Malaysia in 2004, he met a teenager named Aizat Rakyat who told him how Abdullah was demolishing native villages to make way for building luxury hotels. When the Boxing Day tsunami struck, he used the disaster to "evacuate" the villagers and build more hotels in the place. James, disgusted, quits the mission and joins Kyle in a scheme to embarrass Abdullah.

James' younger sister Lauren Adams and a younger agent, Kevin Sumner, are also going on the mission. James sneaks into Lauren's room early in the morning and installs a tracking device in her mobile phone. He is about to leave when his friend Bruce Norris (who has broken up with his girlfriend Bethany Parker) agrees to join them. Together, they go and meet Helena Bayliss, runner of charity Guilt Trips, journalist Hugh Verhoeven and former businessman Dion Frei, who are working to discredit Abdullah. Lauren and Kevin go on a shopping trip with the son and daughter of Tan Abdullah, and James, using the tracking device in Lauren's phone, invites paparazzi to their locations, embarrassing Tan Abdullah's family. Meanwhile, Frei, claiming to act on behalf of the French Government, offers Abdullah a weapons deal that is more favourable than Britain's offer and secretly films Abdullah making disparaging remarks about the Malaysian Prime Minister. When Abdullah's actions are revealed to the media, Abdullah commits suicide to avoid further embarrassment. James and Bruce return to CHERUB campus, where Chairwoman Zara Asker implies that she knows what they were up to. However, she decides not to take any action against them.

James leaves for Stanford University in California, but changing  his name to "Robert James Choke" for post-CHERUB life. A year later, he returns to London to visit Kerry and Lauren. The three visit Gwen Choke's grave, and Kerry tells James and Lauren that their mother would be very proud of them.

In the epilogue of the book, Bethany Parker is expelled from CHERUB because she breached security by continuing to have a relationship with someone she met outside campus on a mission. Kerry leaves CHERUB and joins with James at Stanford University. Even though Kerry was suspicious that James cheated on her during his first year of college, he did not. CHERUB chairwoman's dog Meatball is also revealed to have become a father of three puppies. Lauren's father Ron dies from throat cancer shortly after being released from prison, and James meets his biological father after seeing his name on one of his school textbooks (hence the origin of James' above average mathematics skills).

Release information 
The book was released on 27 August 2010 in hardback edition (2 September in some locations). The paperback version was released in May 2011. A special edition of the book was available at W H Smith with an orange cover. The book was the second in the series to be released in hardback format.

Notes

External links
 Page on CHERUB website
 Preview chapters

CHERUB novels
2010 British novels
Hodder & Stoughton books